Elfshadow is a fantasy novel by Elaine Cunningham, set in the world of the Forgotten Realms, and based on the Dungeons & Dragons game.

Plot summary
Elfshadow is a novel in which Arilyn Moonblade believes she will be the next target of a killer who has been killing members of the Harpers organization.

Reception

Reviews
Kliatt
Magia i Miecz
Review by John C. Bunnell (1991) in Dragon Magazine, November 1991

References

1991 American novels
Forgotten Realms novels